Markook is a Mandal & it's an Outer suburbs of Hyderabad City, Now it is a part of Hyderabad Metropolitan Development Authority.And comes under Siddipet District

The kaleshwaram projects 2nd biggest Kondapochamma Sagar reservoir is here in Markook outskirts Konda Pochamma Sagar Reservoir

Siddipet district of Telangana State, India.

Geography 
Markook a major gram panchayath of Gajwel constituency and also it's a part of the Hyderabad Metropolitan Development Authority.

Assembly constituency: Gajwel

Assembly MLA: Kalvakuntla Chandrashekar Rao

Lok Sabha constituency: Medak

Parliament MP: Kotha Prabhakar Reddy

References

Mandal headquarters in Siddipet district
Villages in Siddipet district